Joe McKee is a London-born composer and sound artist. He was raised in the Darling Ranges of Western Australia from the age of five.

Background

McKee was born in London on 3 December 1984. He moved to Perth, Western Australia with his family at the age of five. In 2003, he became a founding member of Snowman.

After Snowman dissolved, McKee began composing under his own name for film, TV and his solo project. His debut album, Burning Boy, was released through Dot Dash Recordings in Australia in 2012, and through Big Ship in the UK and Europe in 2013. Since then McKee has contributed sound art installations to various group exhibitions including the L.A. based MAMA gallery inaugural exhibition.

Discography

Albums
With Snowman
 Snowman (Dot Dash, 2006)
 The Horse, The Rat and The Swan (Dot dash, 2008)
 Absence (2011)

Solo
 Burning Boy (Dot Dash/Remote Control, 2012)
 An Australian Alien (Babyrace, 2018)

References

External links
 

1984 births
Living people
Australian singer-songwriters
Australian guitarists
21st-century Australian singers
21st-century guitarists
21st-century Australian male singers
Australian male guitarists
Australian male singer-songwriters